William Borah is a bronze sculpture depicting the American politician of the same name by Bryant Baker, installed in the United States Capitol Visitor Center's Emancipation Room, in Washington, D.C., as part of the National Statuary Hall Collection. The statue was gifted by the U.S. state of Idaho in 1947.

The statue is one of three that Baker has had placed in the Collection.

See also
 1947 in art

References

External links

 

1947 establishments in Washington, D.C.
Bronze sculptures in Washington, D.C.
Monuments and memorials in Washington, D.C.
Borah, William
Sculptures of men in Washington, D.C.